Hannah Elias (born c. 1865, died c.) was an American sex worker and landlord who became one of the richest Black women in the world during her lifetime.

Early life 
Hannah Elias was born in Philadelphia, Pennsylvania, at 1820 Addison Street, one of nine children. Her father Charles Elias was a "negro with Indian blood in him" who ran a large, well-regarded catering operation, her mother Mary Elias was "almost white", and they sent her to public school. In 1884, to attend her sister Hattie's wedding in style, Hannah borrowed a ball gown without permission from her employer, leading to a sentence at Moyamensing Prison and her banishment from home.

On her own 
Supporting herself as a sex worker at a "resort" owned by Emelyn Truitt in Manhattan's Tenderloin neighborhood, she met wealthy glass-factory owner John R. Platt, forty-five years her senior. She left the brothel when her twin brother David and suitor Frank P. Satterfield asked her to live with the latter in a boardinghouse in east Philadelphia. She became pregnant and gave birth at the Blockley Almshouse in December 1885, giving the child up for adoption.

Affair with John R. Platt 
After Elias reunited with Platt, he gave her large sums of money, "volunteerd [sic] to start her in the boarding-house business", at 128 W 53rd Street, where as proprietress she rented a room to Cornelius Williams. She then moved into a mansion at 236 Central Park West, passing as Sicilian or Cuban. Williams later fatally shot city planner Andrew H. Green in front of Green's Park Avenue home, confusing him with Platt.

Blackmail case 
When Platt, prodded by his family, accused her of blackmailing him out of $685,385, the affair merited The World's lead story on 1 June 1904, describing her as his "ebony enslaver". Asked about allegations that she had been blackmailed as well, she responded "I have read in the newspapers that I have been, and I am frank to say that there must be some truth in a story which is given so much in detail." The novelty of a Black woman with the equivalent of tens of millions of dollars, living in one of the wealthiest neighborhoods in New York, caused the Seeing New York electric bus tours to make Elias's house a stop. Platt initially refused to swear a criminal complaint, but relented, allowing police serving a criminal warrant to break down her door, where they were escorted to Elias by her Japanese butler, Kato. At the time she said: "I have no fear. I have done no wrong, and every one of the poor people I have helped is praying for me in the time of my affliction." She was arraigned in Tombs Court on June 10, 1904. Held on $30,000 bail, meetings at the house of R. C. Cooper at 318 W. 58th St. and 149 W. 43rd St. raised money for her release. When Platt was "asked directly about Hannah Elias he aimed blows at the reporter with his umbrella and shouted: 'Don't talk to me about Hannah Elias.'" The story spread, leading to detailed court coverage in the Baltimore Sun as she took the stand and described how her money was kept in "15 savings banks" as well as "houses and lands worth $150,000, furniture and plate, worth $100,000, and jewels valued at as much more." After losing his initial court case, the court of appeals eventually ruled against Platt, allowing her to keep his gifts.

Later life 
In 1906, newspapers reported that Elias evicted white tenants from several apartment buildings on West 135th Street with a note reading, "in the future none but respectable colored families were to occupy the flats".
 She was rumored to have continued in this vein, named in a 1912 article titled "Negroes Crowding Whites" as the purchaser of a $250,000 apartment building at 546–552 Lenox Avenue; however, she refuted these claims through her lawyer, Andrew F. Murray, in 1906. By 1915 she was living in a penthouse in one of her "numerous properties" at 501 W. 113th St. She joined forces with noted Harlem developer John Nail but later left for Europe with her butler, Kato, never to return.

References

Further reading 

1865 births
American landlords
African-American businesspeople
Year of death missing
American sex workers